Strzelce Wielkie may refer to the following places:
Strzelce Wielkie, Greater Poland Voivodeship (west-central Poland)
Strzelce Wielkie, Lesser Poland Voivodeship (south Poland)
Strzelce Wielkie, Łódź Voivodeship (central Poland)